KTKZ (1380 AM, "The Answer") is a commercial radio station in Sacramento, California. It is one of four Sacramento-area radio stations owned by the Salem Media Group. KTKZ airs a conservative talk radio format, mostly featuring syndicated shows from the co-owned Salem Radio Network.

KTKZ operates at 5,000 watts with separate daytime and nighttime transmitter sites.  A directional antenna is used at all times to avoid interfering with other stations on AM 1380.

Programming
Weekdays begin with a local talk and information show hosted by Phil Cowan.  That's followed by Dennis Prager, Sebastian Gorka, Larry Elder, Jay Sekulow,  Eric Metaxas,  and Hugh Hewitt.  Weekends feature programs on health, money, law, real estate and travel, some of which are paid brokered programming.  Weekend hosts include Bruce DuMont and Rudy Maxa, as well as repeats of weekday shows.  Most hours begin with news from Townhall News.

History
In 1952, the station signed on as KGMS.  It was owned by Capitol Radio Enterprises, with studios in the Hotel Senator.  KGMS was originally a daytimer, powered at 1,000 watts and required to go off the air from sunset to sunrise.

In 1997, the Salem Media Group paid $1.5 million to buy the station.  On May 15, 2013, KTKZ was re-branded as "AM 1380 The Answer".

References

External links
FCC History Cards for KTKZ
KTKZ official website

TKZ
Talk radio stations in the United States
Conservative talk radio
Radio stations established in 1952
1952 establishments in California
Salem Media Group properties